Lemeshkino is a rural locality (a selo) and the administrative center of Lemeshkinskoye Rural Settlement, Rudnyansky District, Volgograd Oblast, Russia. The population was 1,181 as of 2010. There are 14 streets.

Geography 
Lemeshkino is located in steppe, on the Khopyorsko-Buzulukskaya Plain, 25 km north of Rudnya (the district's administrative centre) by road. Borodayevka is the nearest rural locality.

References 

Rural localities in Rudnyansky District, Volgograd Oblast
Kamyshinsky Uyezd